Kenneth Rupert Lodge (born 1943) is a British linguist and Emeritus Reader in Linguistics and Phonetics at the University of East Anglia.
He is best known for his works on phonetics and phonology.

Books
 A Critical Introduction to Phonetics, 2009, Continuum.
 Fundamental Concepts in Phonology: Sameness and Difference, 2009, Edinburgh University Press.
 The German Language, Lodge, K., Boase-Beier, J., Lodge, K. & Boase-Beier, J. (ed.), 2003, Wiley.

References

1943 births
Living people
Alumni of the University of East Anglia
Linguists from the United Kingdom
British phonologists
Academics of the University of East Anglia
Phoneticians